The Metropolitan Borough of Solihull is a metropolitan borough in West Midlands county, England. It is named after its largest town, Solihull, from which Solihull Metropolitan Borough Council is based. For Eurostat purposes it is a NUTS 3 region (code UKG32) and is one of seven boroughs or unitary districts that comprise the "West Midlands" NUTS 2 region. Much of the large residential population in the north of the borough centres on the communities of Castle Bromwich, Kingshurst, Marston Green and Smith's Wood as well as the towns of Chelmsley Wood and Fordbridge. In the south are the towns of Shirley and Solihull, as well as the large villages of Knowle, Dorridge, Meriden and Balsall Common.

Since 2011, Solihull has formed part of the Greater Birmingham & Solihull Local Enterprise Partnership along with neighbouring authorities Birmingham, Bromsgrove, Cannock Chase, East Staffordshire, Lichfield, Redditch, Tamworth and Wyre Forest.

History
Solihull probably derived its name from a 'miry or muddy' or soily hill.  The parish church was built on a hill of stiff red marl, which turned to sticky mud in wet weather.

In 1894, Solihull (including the parishes of Shirley, Baddesley Clinton, Barston, Lapworth, Balsall, Bushwood, Elmdon, Knowle, Nuthurst, Packwood and Tanworth-in-Arden) was made into the Solihull Rural District in the county of Warwickshire. In 1932 some of its rural areas were taken away when the RDC was succeeded by Solihull Urban District Council.  Expansion continued and Queen Elizabeth II granted a charter in 1954 making Solihull into a Municipal Borough; ten years later it was given the status of County Borough.  Reorganisation of boundaries and council responsibilities in 1974 created the Metropolitan Borough of Solihull by the merger of the Solihull County Borough and most of the Meriden Rural District, which forms the main rural part of the borough and county.  It included Balsall Common, Barston, Berkswell, Bickenhill, Castle Bromwich, Chelmsley Wood, Elmdon, Fordbridge, Hampton in Arden, Hockley Heath, Kingshurst, Knowle, Marston Green, Meriden, Olton, Smiths Wood, Solihull, Shirley and Temple Balsall.

In 1986 the Solihull borough effectively became a unitary authority when the West Midlands County Council was abolished.  It remains part of the West Midlands for ceremonial purposes, and for functions such as police, fire and public transport. There is some support to return the borough to Warwickshire for ceremonial purposes, as was the case when the County of Avon was abolished and Bath was returned to Somerset. There were also complaints that Solihull was not involved in the design of the Warwickshire flag in 2016.

Geography
The borough is bordered by the M6 and the M40 and split by the M42 which divides the urban centre of the borough from the rural south and east.  The borough's transport links have led to a number of established large businesses being based in the borough, such as Land Rover, the National Exhibition Centre and Birmingham Airport.  A short automatic light transport system links the airport to the nearby Birmingham International railway station.  Around three-quarters of the borough is greenbelt and a large proportion of that is worked farmland.  The borough shares its boundaries with Birmingham to the west and north, Coventry to the east, Warwickshire to both the north and south and Worcestershire to the south west.  The borough contains a sizeable rural area known as the Meriden Gap (after the village of Meriden) which serves as a green belt separating the Birmingham conurbation from the city of Coventry. Parts of Solihull neighbour the suburbs of Minworth and Hall Green. Parts also lie close to (but not contiguous with) the town of Coleshill and city of Coventry.

Council

Elections to the council are held in three out of every four years, with one third of the 51 seats on the council being elected at each election. Since the 2011 election The Conservative Party has had a majority on the council.

At the 2015 election to the council, the following members were returned:

For election purposes the council is divided up into the following wards based on civil parishes. Each ward is represented by three councillors:

Bickenhill
Blythe
Castle Bromwich
Chelmsley Wood
Dorridge and Hockley Heath
Elmdon
Kingshurst and Fordbridge
Knowle
Lyndon
Meriden
Olton
Shirley East
Shirley South
Shirley West
Silhill
Smith's Wood
St Alphege

Coat of arms
The constituent parts of the borough's coat of arms are:
Battlements, sickles and an oak tree with golden acorns, which represent the rural and agricultural nature of the Forest of Arden.
The Black Griffin is taken from the arms of the Earls of Aylesford, who are associated with Meriden.
The Silver Fleur-de-lys comes from the Digby family, who were associated with Fordbridge.
The Black Greyhound is taken from the arms of the Greswolds, the family who built the 15th century house called the Manor House in the High Street, Solihull.

A stylised version of the coat of arms can be seen on the top left of Solihull Metropolitan Borough Council's website pages, and the official, heraldic version appears on a dedicated page on the same site – external links below.

Economy
Solihull is regarded as having one of the strongest subregional economies in the West Midlands, with a significantly higher nominal GVA per capita and Silhillians enjoying considerably higher disposable income rates than both regional and UK averages.

Analysis also shows Solihull as having the lowest (and fastest falling) claimant count for Jobseeker's Allowance in the region.

The current Flybe airline maintains its head office on the second floor of Diamond House on the property of Birmingham Airport.

This is a chart of trend of regional gross value added of Solihull at current basic prices published (pp. 240–253) by Office for National Statistics with figures in millions of British Pounds Sterling.

 includes hunting and forestry

 includes energy and construction

 includes financial intermediation services indirectly measured

 Components may not sum to totals due to rounding

Settlements in Solihull

Localities in the borough include:

Balsall, Balsall Common, Barston, Bentley Heath, Berkswell, Bickenhill, Blossomfield
Castle Bromwich, Catherine-de-Barnes, Chadwick End, Chelmsley Wood, Cheswick Green, Coleshill Heath, Copt Heath
Dickens Heath, Dorridge
Elmdon, Elmdon Heath
Fordbridge
Hampton in Arden, Hockley Heath
Kingshurst, Knowle
Lyndon
Marston Green, Meriden, Monkspath Street
Olton
Packwood
Sharmans Cross, Shirley, Silhill, Smith's Wood, Solihull
Temple Balsall, Tidbury Green
Whitlock's End

Notable people
 Dorian Yates - IFBB Pro Bodybuilder and six time Mr Olympia winner (1992-1997) born in Solihull. 
 Michael Buerk – BBC news presenter and journalist born and educated in Solihull.
 Jasper Carrott – Born and lived in the Solihull Area 
Lucy Davis - Daughter of Jasper Carrott. Born and raised in Solihull
 Richard Hammond – Top Gear presenter and radio presenter was born in Solihull.
 Martin Johnson – Rugby World Cup- winning England team captain and later their manager was born in Solihull.
 John Wyndham – Science fiction author (The Day of the Triffids) was born in Dorridge in the Solihull area.

There is a longer list in the article for Solihull town.

Freedom of the Borough
The following people and military units have received the Freedom of the Borough of Solihull.

Individuals
 Lance corporal Matthew Croucher: 16 December 2008.

Military Units

References

External links 

Solihull Metropolitan Borough Council
The official tourism website for the Solihull Borough
Solihull's coat of arms
Solihull Observer, the local Solihull newspaper

 Borough
Metropolitan boroughs of the West Midlands (county)
Politics of Solihull
NUTS 3 statistical regions of the United Kingdom